The 2011 World Port Tournament was an international baseball competition held at the Neptunus Family Stadium in Rotterdam, the Netherlands from June 23 to July 3, 2011. It was the 13th edition of the tournament.

In the end, Chinese Taipei won its first title, after beating Cuba in an 11-inning game.

Teams
The following 5 teams confirmed their appearance.

Schedule and results

Standings

Schedule

References

External links
Official Website

World Port Tournament
World Port Tournament
2011 in Dutch sport